Villersexel is a commune in the Haute-Saône department in the region of Bourgogne-Franche-Comté in eastern France.

City
The city, or commune of Villersexel is located within the Haute-Saône department, located within the Bourgogne-Franche-Comté region of France.  As noted, the current population is less than 2,000 residents.  The city center includes several restaurants, a school, a church and the Château de Villersexel.

Battle of Villersexel
In 1871, a battle occurred within the area of Villersexel, with the chateau changing hands between the French and Prussians.  For more information see the wiki page on the Battle of Villersexel

Chateau
The Château de Villersexel is located within the heart of the commune of Villersexel.  The current chateau was built over a short period of time circa 1871 in the architectural style of Louis XIII.  Originally, the chateau was known as the Chateau des Grammont.

History of Chateau
The current chateau was built in only a few years.  Two previous chateau's have stood on the current site.  Both previous chateau's were largely destroyed by fire.  The fire which destroyed the second chateau occurred during the Battle of Villersexel. Remnants of the second chateau remain on the grounds.  The second chateau was reportedly larger than the current chateau.  Reportedly, both of the earlier chateau's were largely constructed of wooden timbers, as was common for many chateaus constructed during the 17th and 18th century.

After the second chateau was destroyed by fire, the baron was looking for a new architect who could design and build a structure that was more resistant to fire.  At the time, the budding architect Gustave Eiffel was experimenting with Iron as a structural material.  The officially listed architects of the current structure are Eiffel and Garnier.  The Chateau is registered as a historic building in France.  The Château de Villersexel is entirely furnished in the style of that period.

Currently, the Château de Villersexel is privately owned, and serves several purposes.  It is a private residence for the owners and their family and houses a small museum.  Additionally, the Chateau serves as a destination for weddings, receptions, and other large events. This Chateau offers a venue for events, including weddings, shows and receptions. Rooms can accommodate up to 100 people, and the chateau can house up to 100 people overnight.

The Chateau is reported to have housed many famous guests and residents, including Lafayette, who is reported to have lived in this Chateau, with stays by Charles De Gaulle and Winston Churchill.

The Chateau receives constant upkeep and renovations, with the bedrooms reflecting history with names such as : Empire, Honneur, Rotonde and Montebello.

Links to Chateau

The Chateau de Villersexel website

Listing on the Historic Hotels of Europe

See also
Communes of the Haute-Saône department
Gustave Eiffel
Battle of Villersexel
 Chateau de Grammont on French Wiki page
 Community Website for Village of Villersexel
 French Wiki page for Villersexel
 Historical Pictures of Villersexel

References

Communes of Haute-Saône